Hematopoietic stem cell transplantation may be used to treat a number of conditions both congenital and acquired.

Acquired
 Malignancies
 Hematological
 Leukemias
 Acute lymphoblastic leukemia (ALL)
 Acute myeloid leukemia (AML)
 Chronic lymphocytic leukemia (CLL)
 Chronic myelogenous leukemia (CML), accelerated phase or blast crisis
 Lymphomas
 Hodgkin's disease
 Non-Hodgkin's lymphoma
 Myelomas
 Multiple myeloma (Kahler's disease)
 Solid tumor cancers
 Neuroblastoma
 Desmoplastic small round cell tumor
 Ewing's sarcoma
 Choriocarcinoma
 Hematologic disease
 Phagocyte disorders
 Myelodysplasia
 Anemias
 Paroxysmal nocturnal hemoglobinuria (PNH; severe aplasia)
 Aplastic anemia
 Acquired pure red cell aplasia
 Myeloproliferative disorders
 Polycythemia vera
 Essential thrombocytosis
 Myelofibrosis
 Metabolic disorders
 Amyloidoses
 Amyloid light chain (AL) amyloidosis
 Environmentally-induced diseases
 Radiation poisoning
 Viral diseases
 HTLV
 HIV
 Autoimmune diseases
 Multiple sclerosis

Congenital
 Lysosomal storage disorders
 Lipidoses (disorders of lipid storage)
 Neuronal ceroid lipofuscinoses
 Infantile neuronal ceroid lipofuscinosis (INCL, Santavuori disease,)
 Jansky–Bielschowsky disease (late infantile neuronal ceroid lipofuscinosis)
Sphingolipidoses
Niemann–Pick disease
Gaucher disease
Leukodystrophies
 Adrenoleukodystrophy
 Metachromatic leukodystrophy
 Krabbe disease (globoid cell leukodystrophy)
 Mucopolysaccharidoses
 Hurler syndrome (MPS I H, α-L-iduronidase deficiency)
 Scheie syndrome (MPS I S)
 Hurler–Scheie syndrome (MPS I H-S)
 Hunter syndrome (MPS II, iduronidase sulfate deficiency)
 Sanfilippo syndrome (MPS III)
 Morquio syndrome (MPS IV)
 Maroteaux–Lamy syndrome (MPS VI)
 Sly syndrome (MPS VII)
 Glycoproteinoses
 Mucolipidosis II (I-cell disease)
 Fucosidosis
 Aspartylglucosaminuria
 Alpha-mannosidosis
 Other
 Wolman disease (acid lipase deficiency)
 Immunodeficiencies
 T-cell deficiencies
 Ataxia-telangiectasia
 DiGeorge syndrome
 Combined T- and B-cell deficiencies
 Severe combined immunodeficiency (SCID), all types
 Well-defined syndromes
 Wiskott–Aldrich syndrome
 Phagocyte disorders
 Kostmann syndrome
 Shwachman–Diamond syndrome
 Immune dysregulation diseases
 Griscelli syndrome, type II
 Innate immune deficiencies
 NF-Kappa-B Essential Modulator (NEMO) deficiency (Inhibitor of Kappa Light Polypeptide Gene Enhancer in B Cells Gamma Kinase deficiency)
 Hematologic diseases
 Hemoglobinopathies
 Sickle cell disease
 β thalassemia major (Cooley's anemia)
 Anemias
 Aplastic anemia
 Diamond–Blackfan anemia
 Fanconi anemia
 Cytopenias
 Amegakaryocytic thrombocytopenia
 Hemophagocytic syndromes
Hemophagocytic lymphohistiocytosis (HLH)

References

Stem cells